The Fremont Troll (also known as The Troll, or the Troll Under the Bridge) is a public sculpture in the Fremont neighborhood of Seattle, Washington in the United States.

Description

The Troll is a mixed media colossal statue, located on N. 36th Street at Troll Avenue N., under the north end of the George Washington Memorial Bridge (also known as the Aurora Bridge). It is clutching an actual Volkswagen Beetle, as if it had just swiped it from the roadway above. The vehicle has a California license plate. Originally, the car held a time capsule, including a plaster bust of Elvis Presley, which was stolen when the sculpture was vandalized.

Artists and inspiration
The Troll was sculpted by four local artists: Steve Badanes, Will Martin, Donna Walter, and Ross Whitehead. The idea of a troll living under a bridge is derived from the Scandinavian (Norwegian) folklore.

The artists have copyright to the Troll images. They have sued businesses that use its image commercially without written permission. Postcards, beer, and other products approved by the artists are commercially available, and use is free to non-profit organizations.

History

In 1990, the Fremont Arts Council launched an art competition for the area under the bridge with the intent to construct hostile architecture to deter the presence of "rodents, mattresses, beer cans, [and] guys sleeping" there, believing that the solution to the issue was "having a piece of art" instead. The piece, built later that same year, easily won the competition, and was meant to become a cultural icon of the city from its conception. The vote in favor of the "funky" troll was also motivated of concerns about increased development in Fremont, including numerous large apartment buildings and an office park, damaging the largely residential neighborhood's "historic character" at the time.

The construction of the troll provoked immediate complaints from homeless people who previously lived under the bridge, and in 1991, just a year after it was erected, neighbors funded powerful floodlights to deter squatters and "late-night revelers" from acts of vandalism targeting the troll's beard and hair, as well as the continued dumping of trash around it by homeless people who used to live there. Despite the intent of the arts council, the sculpture has periodically been the target of vandalism, although local activists have made efforts to clean graffiti on a regular basis, and the city of Seattle has swept homeless encampments adjacent to the sculpture following repeated drug overdoses in January 2019; from January to mid-May alone, the city received 28 complaints about needles or homelessness within a block of the sculpture.

In 2005, the segment of Aurora Avenue North under the bridge, running downhill from the Troll to North 34th Street was renamed "Troll Avenue" in honor of the sculpture. In 2011 the Fremont Arts Council licensed a Chia Pet based on the Fremont Troll that was sold at a local drug store chain. In 2016, the Chicago rock band Majungas released "The Fremont Troll" off their Seattle Rock album.

In 2022, the Seattle Kraken introduced Buoy, a mascot said to be the Fremont Troll's nephew.

In popular culture 
The seventh and final season of the ABC fantasy-drama series Once Upon a Time features a fictionalized version of the sculpture. Filming for the series took place in Vancouver, Canada, as such, a replica of the sculpture was built for the show. In the season's fourteenth episode, "The Girl in the Tower", a backstory for the sculpture is revealed, which includes references to the 1982 children's book The BFG.

References

External links
 Artists Republic of Fremont
 Fremont Arts Council
 Fremont Chamber of Commerce: The Fremont Troll
 Save Outdoor Sculpture Survey

Outdoor sculptures in Seattle
1990 sculptures
Concrete sculptures in Washington (state)
Troll
Trolls in popular culture
Roadside attractions in Washington (state)
Vandalized works of art in Washington (state)